Coney Street is a major shopping street in the city centre of York, in England. The street runs north-west from the junction of Spurriergate and Market Street, to St Helen's Square.  New Street leads off the north-east side of the street, as does a snickelway leading to the Judge's Court hotel, while several snickelways lead from the south-west side down to the River Ouse, including Blanshard's Lane, and paths leading to City Screen.

History
The street was first established in the Roman Eboracum period, running parallel to and outside the city's south-western wall.  At the time, the city's bridge over the River Ouse lay at its northern end.  Excavations have located remains of a 1st-century grain warehouse on the south-west side of the street.  By 980, the first Ouse Bridge had been constructed, further south, but the street remained important, traffic reaching the bridge from the north along it.

The street was first recorded in about 1150, as "Cuningstrete", the King's Street.  The use of "street" rather than "gate" suggests that the name dates from the Anglian period, and two coin hoards from the period were found in the 1760s.  By 1150, the road was considered to run all the way from Ousegate to what is now St Helen's Square, the part which is now Spurriergate sometimes distinguished as "Little Coney Street", while Lendal was regarded as a northern extension, named Old Coney Street.  St Martin le Grand, on the street, was recorded in the Domesday Book, and unlike most streets in York, Coney Street was divided between parishes: St Martin Le Grand; St Michael, Spurriergate; and St Helen, Stonegate.

In the 12th century, Coney Street was known for its Jewish population, with its residents including Aaron of York, considered the wealthiest Jew in England.  It also housed York's synagogue.  In 1190, the Jews of York were massacred, and many of their houses were burned down.  In 1279, after the Jews had been expelled from England, Roger Basy and John Sampson were granted their former property on Coney Street.

In 1308, Coney Street was described as the most important street in York.  In 1335, a row of houses were built in the churchyard of St Martin; almost entirely rebuilt on several occasions, the last remains survived until 1958.  In 1396, the Gild of St Christopher Maison Dieu almshouse was constructed on the street, and in 1459, York Guildhall was built next to it, at the northern end of the street.  York Mansion House was built in front of it in 1725, and in 1782 the area in front of it was cleared to create St Helen's Square.

Four of the locations at which the historic York Mystery Plays were performed lay the street.

The Bull Inn was built in the 15th century, which from 1459 was the only place in the city at which foreigners could stay.  The George Inn opened on the street in 1614, becoming the city's most prominent coaching inn.  Soon after, the Black Swan was built on the other side of the street, a large inn which could stable 130 horses.  In 1691, the Bagnio Turkish bath was built just off the street.  This was later converted into St Peter's School, and then a printing house where the first edition of Tristram Shandy was published.

During the 18th century, the street became known for banking.  It also became the home of the York Courant newspaper, and later, of the Yorkshire Evening Post and Yorkshire Herald.  The street's continuing importance led to it being widened in 1769, and again in 1841.

During the 19th century, the street became lined with shops, noted businesses including the House of Bewlay tobacconist, Burgin's perfumery, and the Leak & Thorp department store. Clothing shops were particularly prominent, including Iles, R. W. Anderson & Sons, and, later, Burton's.  There were also major grocers' stores: Borders' and Lipton's.  In 1924, The Leopard Inn was demolished, and replaced by the Leopard Arcade, a small shopping centre, but it was destroyed by bombing in 1942.

The Ebor Hall entertainment venue was built just off the street in the 1860s, while there were also several pubs.  In 1915, the Picture House cinema opened, while in 2000, the City Screen cinema opened.  The Willow Cafe was another long-running entertainment venue, opening in the 1950s and surviving until the 2010s, at which time it was a nightclub.

During the 20th century, an increasing number of the shops were taken over by national chains.  Boots opened in 1919, Woolworth's in 1924, and W. H. Smith's in 1920.  The Black Swan was eventually demolished and replaced by a large shop, which became BHS.  Despite the closure of several shops in the 2010s, the street remains home to a mix of High Street shops and cafes, while numerous buskers perform throughout the day.  The musician Chris Helme was discovered while busking on the street.

Architecture

While the street retains numerous historic buildings, most have had their street-level frontage rebuilt during the 20th century.  Notable buildings on the north-east side include the 15th-century 16–22 Coney Street, 24 Coney Street which was built about 1600 but includes part of an earlier building, the early-18th century Judge's Court hotel, and 36–42 Coney Street, dating from the 1780s.  48 Coney Street was built for Boots, in a mock timber framed style, while the former Burtons at 52 Coney Street is in the art deco style.  On the south-west side lie the early 18th-century 3–7, 9, and 13 Coney Street, the last incorporating part of a Mediaeval wall by the Ouse.  15 Coney Street is the former York Courant office, built around 1800, while 17 Coney Street includes one surviving column from the George Inn.  29 and 31 Coney Street dates from about 1600, while 33 and 39 Coney Street both date from the 18th century.

References

 
Streets in York